Mabílio Albuquerque (born 3 June 1969) is a Portuguese butterfly and freestyle swimmer. He competed in two events at the 1988 Summer Olympics.

References

External links
 

1969 births
Living people
Portuguese male butterfly swimmers
Portuguese male freestyle swimmers
Olympic swimmers of Portugal
Swimmers at the 1988 Summer Olympics
Place of birth missing (living people)